The Gletscher Ducan (also known as Ducan Dador) is a mountain of the Albula Alps, located in Graubünden, Switzerland. On its northern side lies a glacier named Ducangletscher. It lies south-west of the Hoch Ducan.

External links
 Gletscher Ducan on Hikr

Mountains of the Alps
Alpine three-thousanders
Mountains of Switzerland
Mountains of Graubünden
Davos
Bergün Filisur